Sir Merrik Burrell, 1st Baronet (5 November 1699 – 6 April 1787) was a British politician.

He was the second son of Peter Burrell and his wife, Isabella Merrik, daughter of John Merrik. He bought West Grinstead Park in 1744.

Burrell entered the British House of Commons for Great Marlow in 1747, sat for it until 1754 and was subsequently returned for Grampound, which he represented until 1768. 

He was elected for Haslemere in 1774 and stood then for Great Bedwyn, becoming its representative until 1784.

Burrell was governor of the Bank of England from 1758 to 1760, and, on 15 July 1766, he was created a baronet, of West Grinstead Park in the County of Sussex, with a special remainder to the heirs male of his older brother Peter. Burrell's tenure as Governor occurred during the Bengal bubble (1757–1769).

Burrell died unmarried and childless in 1787. He was succeeded in the baronetcy by his nephew's son, Peter, who was later elevated to the Peerage of Ireland as Baron Gwydyr.

References

1699 births
1787 deaths
Baronets in the Baronetage of Great Britain
British MPs 1747–1754
British MPs 1754–1761
British MPs 1761–1768
British MPs 1774–1780
British MPs 1780–1784
Merrick
Members of the Parliament of Great Britain for English constituencies
Governors of the Bank of England
Members of the Parliament of Great Britain for constituencies in Cornwall
Deputy Governors of the Bank of England
Members of Parliament for Great Bedwyn
People from West Grinstead